The Stand Ins is the fifth full-length studio album by American indie rock band Okkervil River, released on September 9, 2008. The album is the second half of The Stage Names, a planned double album. The title comes from the term 'stand-in', a person who substitutes for the actor before filming for technical purposes.
If the cover art for The Stage Names is placed above that of The Stand-Ins, a complete picture is formed. The album charted at #42 with 11,000 copies sold, according to the Billboard 200.

Shearwater's Jonathan Meiburg and guitarist Charles Bissell of The Wrens contributed to the album.

Overview
Conceived as a companion piece to The Stage Names, The Stand Ins continued the band's preoccupation with pop culture, celebrity suicide, and life as a musician. The track "Lost Coastlines," which features a duet with Shearwater's Jonathan Meiburg, deals with trying to keep the band together despite the band's constant touring. "Starry Stairs" depicts the life and suicide of porn star Shannon Wilsey. The final track on The Stand Ins, "Bruce Wayne Campbell Interviewed on the Roof of the Chelsea Hotel, 1979," details the career and disillusionment of glam rock musician Bruce Wayne Campbell (better known as Jobriath).

Reception

The Stand Ins has received positive reviews. The album currently has a score of 78 out of 100 on the review aggregate site Metacritic, indicating "Generally favorable reviews."

PopMatters' Joseph Carver praised the album's narrative, writing "Once again, a record made up of relatively unlikeable characters becomes a fixture in your psyche thanks to Will Sheff’s ability to find the humanity in their stories." Pitchfork Media also praised the album's lyrics, with reviewer Stephen Deusner calling Sheff "...one of the best lyric-writers going in indie rock." Deusner continued: "Song for song, he can jerk a tear with a carefully observed detail or turn of phrase... but it's the way those songs talk to one another that makes Okkeril River albums so durable and fascinating."

In a less positive review, Melanie Haupt of The Austin Chronicle criticized the album for being unpolished and unfocused, writing "The Stand Ins doesn't really figure out what it wants to be until its second half." In another mixed review, Magnet's Chris Barton also criticized the album for being unfocused, writing "Okkervil River can deliver terrific songs when ambitions are kept in balance, but this uneven record is in dire need of an editor."

Track list

Personnel
The following people contributed to The Stand Ins:

Okkervil River
 Will Sheff – Casio, composer, acoustic, electric and rhythm guitar, keyboards, photography, vocals
 Charles Bissell – electric guitar
 Scott Brackett – audio engineer, cornet, editing, engineer, Hammond B3, Mellotron, Hammond organ, percussion, synthesizer, vocals
 Brian Cassidy – arranger, electric guitar, mandolin, pedal steel, string arrangements, vocals
 Jonathan Meiburg – banjo, piano, vocals, Wurlitzer
 Justin Sherburn – carillon, Hammond B3, Mellotron, piano, vocals
 Travis Nelsen – claves, clavinet, drums, maracas, sleigh bells, tambourine, vocals
 Patrick Pestorius – bass, melodica, vocals
 Zachary Thomas – mandolin

Technical personnel
 Brian Beattie – audio production, engineer, electric guitar, Mellotron, percussion, producer, synthesizer
 Felix Beattie – audio engineer
 Brad Bell – audio engineer, engineer
 Roger Seibe; – mastering
 Stuart Sullivan – audio engineer, engineer
 Paul Mahern – audio engineer, engineer

Additional musicians
 Caitlin Bailey – cello
 Mike Hoffer – trombone, trumpet
 Scott Jackson – violin
 David Lobel – alto and baritone saxophone
 Katie Nott – viola
 Kathleen Pittman – violin
 Sarah Pizzichemi – violin
 Francesca Smith – French horn
 Will Thothong – viola
 Tammy Vo – violin

Additional personnel
 Daniel Murphy – layout design
 William Schaff – artwork
 Tatyana Tolstaya – author

Charts

References

External links
Official website
Official "Lost Coastlines" music video

2008 albums
Okkervil River albums
Jagjaguwar albums